Mustassaare is a village in Võru Parish, Võru County, in southeastern Estonia. It is located just southwest of Sõmerpalu, the administrative centre of the municipality. Mustassaare has a population of 31 (as of 1 January 2008).

Mustassaare has a station on currently inactive Valga–Pechory railway.

References

Võru Parish
Villages in Võru County